Muztagh Tower, also: Mustagh Tower; Muztagh: icy mountain), is a mountain in the Baltoro Muztagh, part of the Karakoram range in Baltistan on the border of the Gilgit–Baltistan region of Pakistan and the Xinjiang Uyghur Autonomous Region of China. It stands between the basins of the Baltoro and Sarpo Laggo glaciers.

Early prominence

The Mustagh Tower was the subject of a photograph taken by Vittorio Sella during the 1909 Italian expedition to K2. Taken from the upper Baltoro, due southeast of the mountain, the twin summits were perfectly aligned and the mountain was seen as a slender tooth, and looked impregnable. In 1941, the photograph was featured in a book on mountaineering with the caption "The Last Citadel".

First and second ascents
Nearly fifty years after Sella's photo was taken, in 1956, his photograph inspired two expeditions to race for the first ascent. Both teams found their routes less steep than Sella's view had suggested.  The British expedition, consisting of John Hartog, Joe Brown, Tom Patey and Ian McNaught-Davis, came from the Chagaran Glacier on the west side of the peak and reached the summit via the Northwest Ridge first on 6 July, five days before the French team (:fr:Guido Magnone, :fr:Robert Paragot, André Contamine, Paul Keller) climbed the mountain from the east. François Florence waited for the two parties at the camp IV during 42 hours without a radio, when they went, reached the summit and came back to this camp.

Notable ascents and attempts
 1984 Northwest Ridge 2nd of route, 3rd of peak by Mal Duff, Tony Brindle, Jon Tinker and Sandy Allan (all UK).
 1990 The fourth ascent was made by Göran Kropp and Rafael Jensen.

A lower summit,  was first climbed in 1984 by the northeast ridge.

 2008 On 24 August 2008, the Northeast Face was climbed by two Slovenian alpinists, Pavle Kozjek and Dejan Miškovič. They bivouacked on the crest after 17 hours of climbing. They decided not to go to the summit because of strong wind. Just after they started descending, Kozjek fell to his death.
 2012 On the day of 25 August, 56 years after the day when the first man climbed to the top of this mountain, three Russians made an ascent by the centre Northeast Face. Sergei Nilov, Dmitry Golovchenko and Alexander Lange reached the top and made a new route. The ascent lasted for 17 days.

See also
 List of mountains in Pakistan
 List of Ultras of the Karakoram and Hindu Kush

Notes

Mountains of Gilgit-Baltistan
Seven-thousanders of the Karakoram